Gheyzaniyeh or Ghezaniyeh may refer to:
 Gheyzaniyeh-ye Bozorg
 Gheyzaniyeh Rural District

See also
 Qeyzaniyeh (disambiguation)